{{Album ratings
| rev1 = Allmusic
| rev1Score = <ref name=""allmusic"">{{cite web|url=https://www.allmusic.com/album/the-other-side-of-the-rainbow-mw0000477886|title=The Other Side of the Rainbow|work=Allmusic|accessdate=2021-11-15}}</ref>}}The Other Side of the Rainbow is the twelfth album by American singer Melba Moore. It was released by Capitol Records on October 10, 1982. The album features her top 10 R&B and dance hit "Love's Comin' At Ya". The Other Side of the Rainbow''s title track is best known for its ending note, which Melba holds for 38 seconds.

Track listing

Charts

Weekly charts

Year-end charts

References

1982 albums
Melba Moore albums
Capitol Records albums